Beaumont Hospital, Royal Oak (BHRO) is a nationally ranked, 1131 bed non-profit, acute care teaching hospital located in Royal Oak, Michigan, providing tertiary care and healthcare services to the Royal Oak region and Metro Detroit. Beaumont Hospital, Royal Oak is the flagship facility of the Beaumont Health System. The hospital is affiliated with the Oakland University William Beaumont School of Medicine, as the primary teaching affiliate. The hospital is an American College of Surgeons verified Level 1 Adult and Level II Pediatric Trauma Center with an onsite helipad to transport critically ill patients from within the region.

The hospital is ranked on the U.S. News & World Report as the #2 best in Michigan after University of Michigan Hospital. It originally opened in January 1955.

History
The hospital was built on the site of what was once the Sharp family farm. Groundbreaking was on June 19, 1953. The hospital opened with 238 beds on January 24, 1955. It was formerly known as William Beaumont Hospital.

In 1997, six days after winning the Stanley Cup, two Detroit Red Wings players, the team massage therapist, and their driver were taken to Beaumont Hospital when their limousine crashed into a tree. Slave Fetisov suffered chest injuries as well as a bruised lung,  but made a full recovery. Team massage therapist Sergei Mnatsakanov was not expected to survive, but did, although he was permanently paralyzed from the waist down. Vladimir Konstantinov also suffered severe injuries and was placed on a ventilator. He was released from Beaumont five months later.

Beaumont Children's 
Beaumont Children's, is an acute care children's hospital in Royal Oak, Michigan. It is affiliated with the Oakland University William Beaumont School of Medicine and located within the larger Beaumont Hospital, Royal Oak. The hospital consists of 101 pediatric beds and provides comprehensive pediatric specialties and subspecialties to infants, children, teens, and young adults aged 0–21 throughout the region. Beaumont Children's shares the onsite helipad for the attached Beaumont Hospital, Royal Oak and is an ACS verified level II pediatric trauma center, one of the only ones in the region.

The hospital features a regional pediatric intensive-care unit and an American Academy of Pediatrics verified level III neonatal intensive care unit.

Beaumont Children's Hospital, now Beaumont Children's, was announced in 2009. Eighty-three sub-specialists, a 40-bed pediatric unit, eight-bed pediatric ICU and 64-bed NICU had been in place at Beaumont, Royal Oak since 2004. In 2008, Beaumont joined the Children's Hospital Association. Facilities include a dedicated specialty inpatient pediatric unit at Beaumont, Royal Oak and inpatient units at the Beaumont hospitals in Troy, Dearborn and Farmington Hills for children with less serious conditions. Specialty pediatric services including emergency care, hematology-oncology, gastroenterology, endocrinology, cardiology, neurology, newborn and pediatric intensive care, pediatric surgery and craniofacial surgery are available at outpatient locations throughout Metro Detroit.

Beaumont Children's cares for more than 100,000 pediatric emergency and after-hours visits every year and 17,000 babies are delivered each year as well. Beaumont Children's is a member of the Children's Hospital Association and the only Southeast Michigan affiliate of Children's Miracle Network Hospitals.

Heliport

William Beaumont Hospital Heliport is a heliport located in Royal Oak, Michigan, United States. It is operated by Beaumont Hospital Royal Oak of Beaumont Health. Currently there is only one helipad, made of concrete. The helipad is 66 feet square [20m x 20m] so only one helicopter can land or take off at one time. A second helipad is being added.

In 2012 Beaumont Hospital, Royal Oak became the co-base of operation of Beaumont One an American Eurocopter EC135 helicopter. The helicopter is operated by PHI Air Medical. Beaumont One is co-based at 32MI - William Beaumont Hospital Heliport and KVLL - Oakland/Troy Airport in Troy, Michigan, United States.

Awards 
The hospital is ranked nationally in 10 different adult specialties on the U.S. News & World Report and is ranked as the #2 best in Michigan after University of Michigan Hospital.

See also 

 Oakland University William Beaumont School of Medicine
 Beaumont Health
 List of children's hospitals in the United States
 List of trauma centers in the United States

References

External links 

 
 www.beaumont.org/services/childrens

Hospitals in Michigan
Hospitals established in 1955
Trauma centers
Children's hospitals in the United States
Pediatric trauma centers